Bosnia and Herzegovina participated in the Eurovision Song Contest 2003 with the song "Ne brini" written by Ines Prajo and Arjana Kunštek. The song was performed by Mija Martina. The Bosnian broadcaster Public Broadcasting Service of Bosnia and Herzegovina (PBSBiH) organised the national final BH Eurosong 2003 in order to select the Bosnian entry for 2003 contest in Riga, Latvia. Eighteen entries participated during the show on 1 March 2003 where the winner was determined over two rounds of voting from an eight-member jury. The top four entries in the first round advanced to the second round, during which "Ne brini" performed by Mija Martina was selected as the winner.

Bosnia and Herzegovina competed in the Eurovision Song Contest which took place on 24 May 2003. Performing during the show in position 6, Bosnia and Herzegovina placed sixteenth out of the 26 participating countries, scoring 27 points.

Background

The nation's best placing in the contest was seventh, which it achieved in 1999 with the song "Putnici" performed by Dino and Béatrice. The Bosnian national broadcaster, Public Broadcasting Service of Bosnia and Herzegovina (PBSBiH), broadcasts the event within Bosnia and Herzegovina and organises the selection process for the nation's entry.

Before Eurovision

BH Eurosong 2003 
The eighth edition of BH Eurosong, BH Eurosong 2003, was held on 1 March 2003 at the Skenderija Hall in Sarajevo and hosted by Ana Vilenica, Enis Bešlagić and Ognjen Blagojević. The show was broadcast on BHTV1 as well as streamed online via the broadcaster's website pbsbih.ba.

Competing entries
76 submissions were received during a submission period where artists and composers to submit their entries, and the broadcaster announced the eighteen entries selected to compete in the national final on 31 January 2003. Fifteen of the entries were determined by a selection committee from the received submissions, while the remaining three entries were selected from submissions received by composers that were directly invited by PBSBiH for the competition. Among the competing artists was 1996 Bosnian Eurovision entrant Amila Glamočak.

Final
The final was held on 1 March 2003 at the Skenderija Hall in Sarajevo. Eighteen entries participated and two rounds of jury voting selected the winner. In the first round, the top four entries were selected to proceed to the second round, the superfinal. In the superfinal, "Ne brini" performed by Mija Martina was selected as the winner. The winner was to be selected over two rounds of public televoting, however the jury was used instead due to a large number of votes being cast that caused the televoting system to fail. The eight-member jury panel that voted during both rounds consisted of Ivica Šarić (Minister of Culture and Sports at Sarajevo), Miša Molk (Slovenian Head of Delegation at the Eurovision Song Contest), Alma Čardžić (1994 and 1997 Bosnian Eurovision entrant), Goran Janković (artist), Sabahudin Kurt (1964 Yugoslav Eurovision entrant), Dragan Džidić (director of Melodije Mostara), Maja Tatić (2002 Bosnian Eurovision entrant) and Nermin Puškar (musician). In addition to the performances of the competing entries, the show featured a guest performance by 1999 Bosnian Eurovision entrant Dino Merlin.

At Eurovision
According to Eurovision rules, all nations with the exceptions of the bottom ten countries in the 2002 contest competed in the final on 24 May 2003. On 29 November 2002, a special allocation draw was held which determined the running order and Bosnia and Herzegovina was set to perform in position 6, following the entry from Malta and before the entry from Portugal. Bosnia and Herzegovina finished in sixteenth place with 27 points.

The show was broadcast in Bosnia and Herzegovina on BHTV1 with commentary by Dejan Kukrić. The Bosnian spokesperson, who announced the Bosnian votes during the show, was Ana Vilenica.

Voting 
Below is a breakdown of points awarded to Bosnia and Herzegovina and awarded by Bosnia and Herzegovina in the contest. The nation awarded its 12 points to Turkey in the contest.

References

2003
Countries in the Eurovision Song Contest 2003
Eurovision